Ma'mun Bin Sulaiman is a Malaysian politician who has served as the Member of Parliament (MP) for Kalabakan from May 2018 to November 2022. He is a member of the Heritage Party (WARISAN), a party that is aligned with the Pakatan Harapan (PH) opposition coalition.

Personal life 
Ma'mun is the brother of former United Malays National Organisation (UMNO) Kalabakan Women Chief Chaya Sulaiman. His spouse is Warti lakatu and having kids named Nazrin Epizal, Azizi Rahman, Hafizul Ikmal, Eizlan Huzzaini and the last one Izzety Sharmaine.

Elections

2018 general election 
In the 2018 election, his party of Sabah Heritage Party (WARISAN) field him to contest the Kalabakan parliamentary seat, facing the seat defending candidate Abdul Ghapur Salleh from the United Malays National Organisation (UMNO) and subsequently won.

Election results

References 

Living people
People from Sabah
Members of the Dewan Rakyat
Sabah Heritage Party politicians
1965 births